was a Japanese writer.

Life
Tokuda was born in Kanazawa in Ishikawa Prefecture. Coming from a family of the former feudal nobility, Tokuda began his literary life as a follower of the writer Ozaki Kōyō, who was four years his senior and had already established himself as a literary man in the late 1880s. Their relationship wasn't to last long, though, with Kōyō dying in 1903, after which Tokuda began to move from Kōyō's style of romanticism into a mixture of naturalism and the confessional known as "Shizen-shugi", an example of which is his 1908 novel Arajotai (新世帯), which dealt with the frustrations of a young working-class couple.

After the publication of Ashiato (足迹) in 1910, Tokuda would release his most autobiographical work, Kabi (黴), in 1911, a classic example of the Japanese genre known as the "I-novel". He followed with the novel Rough Living (Arakure, あらくれ) in 1915.

After the death of his wife in 1926, Tokuda began a series of relationships with younger women, which would inspire his later works, especially his best-known, Kasō jinbutsu (仮装人物), released from 1935 to 1938, as well as the unfinished Shukuzu (縮図) from 1941.

Legacy
A number of Tokuda's works were adapted into films in Japan. A monument honoring Tokuda was erected near the summit of Mount Utatsu in 1947. The monument features writing authored by poet Murō Saisei and was designed by architect Yoshirō Taniguchi.

Selected works
 1910: Ashiato
 1911: Kabi
 1915: Rough Living (Arakure)
 1933: The Town's Dance Hall (Machi no odoriba)
 1935: Order of the White Paulownia (Kunshō)
 1935–1938: Kasō jinbutsu
 1941: Shukuzu (unfinished)

Bibliography

Adaptations (selected)
 1953: Epitome (Shukuzu), director Kaneto Shindō
 1957: Untamed (Arakure), director Mikio Naruse
 1962: Stolen Pleasure (Tadare), director Yasuzō Masumura

References

External links

 
 
 
 

1872 births
1943 deaths
Japanese writers
People from Kanazawa, Ishikawa